Larsnes Church (formerly named: Larsnes Chapel) is a chapel of the Church of Norway in the municipality of Sande, Møre og Romsdal, Norway. It is located in the village of Larsnes on the island of Gurskøya. It is an annex chapel in the Gursken parish which is part of the Søre Sunnmøre prosti (deanery) in the Diocese of Møre. The gray and white, concrete building was built in 1989 using plans drawn up by the architects Alf Apalseth and Ole Myren. The building seats about 250 people.

See also
List of churches in Møre

References

Sande, Møre og Romsdal
Churches in Møre og Romsdal
Concrete churches in Norway
20th-century Church of Norway church buildings
Churches completed in 1989
1989 establishments in Norway